The 1913–14 Tennessee Volunteers basketball team represents the University of Tennessee during the 1913–14 college men's basketball season. The head coach was Zora G. Clevenger coaching the team in his second season. The Volunteers team captain was Victor H. Klein.

Schedule

|-

References

Tennessee Volunteers basketball seasons
Tennessee
Tennessee Volunteers
Tennessee Volunteers